Os Dez Mandamentos  (English: Moses and the Ten Commandments) is a Brazilian primetime biblical telenovela produced and broadcast by RecordTV. It premiered on Monday, March 23, 2015, replacing Vitória at 8:30 p.m. (BRT/AMT).

Os Dez Mandamentos is written by Vivian de Oliveira and directed by Alexandre Avancini, the novel features the performances of Brazilian actors, Guilherme Winter, Denise Del Vecchio, Giselle Itié, Sérgio Marone, Camila Rodrigues and Sidney Sampaio in the main roles.

According to Ibope (Brazilian Institute of Public Opinion and Statistics), in the week of September 28October 4, 2015 it was the fifth most watched program of the Brazilian television (being the second most-watched scripted show), with an average of 6,210,809 viewers per minute, taking into account a projection of 15 metropolitan areas.

A film adaptation, The Ten Commandments: The Movie, was released in 2016.

The plot received three nominations at the Seoul International Drama Awards of 2016 in the categories of best novela, best director and best writer.

The plot was also nominated for the Shorty Awards, the world's largest social network award in the "Television" category.

Production and scenography
Os Dez Mandamentos is the first telenovela based on a biblical story, both in Brazil and in the World television. The initial expectation is 150 chapters, with external recordings in the Atacama Desert in Chile, as well as recordings in Guarapuava, Paraná. Some of the special effects is produced by a studio in Hollywood. Considered the most expensive production in the history of the station, has an estimated cost of R$700,000 per chapter. Twenty eight scenarios and a scenographic city with more than seven thousand square meters were built, where the cities of the Hebrews and Egyptians are reproduced. For recording, Arri Alexa's digital cameras were used.

Cast

Rating

Brazil

In his debut, Os Dez Mandamentos has acquired an Ibope Rating of 12.1 points in the final numbers, representing the best debut of a Rede Record telenovela since Ribeirão do Tempo, in 2010. At the same time, Jornal Nacional (Globo, 25.3 points) and Carrossel (SBT, 11.8 points) performed well.

United States

References

External links
 

2015 telenovelas
Brazilian telenovelas
Television series based on the Bible
Cultural depictions of Moses
Cultural depictions of Nefertari
RecordTV telenovelas
2015 Brazilian television series debuts
2016 Brazilian television series endings
Television shows filmed in Chile
Portuguese-language telenovelas